Incest is found in folklore and mythology in many countries and cultures in the world.

Polytheistic deities

Greek
In Greek mythology, Gaia (earth) had 12 children with her own son Uranus (sky). She bore six male and six female Titans to her son, Uranus (sky). The male Titans were Oceanus, Coeus, Crius, Hyperion, Lapeteus, and Cronus. The female Titans were Theia, Rhea, Themis, Mnemosyne, Phoebe, and Tethys. Oceanus, Coeus, Hyperion and Cronus each consorted with one of their sisters and mated with them, producing offspring of their own, while Themis and Mnemosyne became wives of their nephew Zeus, Iapetus married his niece Clymene, and Crius married his half-sister Eurybia.

Zeus also fathered a daughter, Persephone, with his other older sister, Demeter. However, the orphic sources claim that Persephone was instead the daughter of Zeus and his mother Rhea.

Nyx and Erebus were also married siblings. The sea god Phorcys fathered many offspring by his sister Ceto.

Among the many lovers of Zeus, some were his daughters. Persephone is the daughter of Demeter and her brother Zeus, and becomes the consort of her uncle Hades. Some legends indicate that her father impregnated her and begat Dionysus Zagreus. Other examples include Zeus's relations with the Muse Calliope, Aphrodite (his daughter in some versions) and Nemesis (his daughter in one tradition).

Egyptian
Horus, the grandson of Geb, had his own mother, Isis, become his imperial consort.

The goddess Hathor was simultaneously considered to be the mother, wife, and daughter of the sun god Ra. Hathor was also occasionally seen as the mother and wife of Horus.

In Egyptian mythology, there are frequent sibling marriages. For example, Shu and Tefnut are brother and sister and they produce offspring, Geb and Nut.

Inca
The patron god on the Incas, Inti, is married to his elder sister Mama Quilla.

Inuit

Oedipus-type tales
Oedipus-type tales are stories that are very similar to Oedipus Rex, which is the most famous tale of mother–son incest. They start with the warning of the fated incest and, in response, the mother deserts her child. If his mother is a queen, princess, or an aristocrat, the son distinguishes himself among her suitors by accomplishing a certain task, thereby earning her hand in marriage as a part of the reward. However, the hero's desertion as a child makes plausible that neither the son nor mother recognize each other, leading to an inadvertent, incestuous consummation. For example, in the Indonesian legend of Tangkuban Perahu, Princess Dayang Sumbi  weds a warrior, unaware she is her son, when he succeeds in recovering a prized weaving needle she lost, and the ancient Greek king Oedipus and his mother Jocasta are also setup for marriage in a similar way. If the mother and son learn the truth about their relationship, it is usually after they wed. 

For example, in the aforementioned Indonesian legend, Princess Dayang Sumbi, while laying aside her sleeping husband, recognizes the scar on his chest as her son's.

Another way the mother-wife discovers the incest in the wedding bed is by an object that she had kept with the baby. The timing of the discovery varies from one night to many years and in some cases, as far as after multiple children are born. In the original tale, for example, Jocasta bears her son four children: Eteocles, Polynices, Antigone, and Ismene.

The core plot, having entered into the world of folklore, is found in folktales of various nations like Greece, Indonesia, India, Albania, Britain, Malaysia, Iran, etc.

Great Flood/Deluge

Siberian
In an Udege myth, a girl and her younger brother are the sole survivors of a great flood. They became the progenitors of the whole human race.

Taiwanese
From Taiwan alone come twenty-eight versions of a brother–sister pair living as husband and wife to become the progenitors of mankind after a great flood.

Miscellaneous

Greek

Mortal 
Myrrha committed incest with her father, Theias, and bore Adonis.

Thyestes raped his daughter Pelopia after an oracle advised him that a son born of them would be the one to kill Atreus, Thyestes' brother and rival.

In some versions of the story of Auge and her son by Heracles, Telephus, the two were nearly married before Heracles revealed the truth of their relation.

Nyctimene was seduced or raped by her father, King Epopeus of Lesbos. In her shame, she avoided showing herself by day, and Athena turned her into an owl.

Orestes married his uncle Menelaus' daughter Hermione.

Norse
Njörðr is sometimes said to be married to Skaði, while other times he's said to be married to his unnamed sister. Ynglinga saga chapter 4, provides an example of the latter, characterizing their union as a Vanir custom:

In Norse legends, the hero Sigmund and his sister Signy murdered her children and begot a son, Sinfjötli. When Sinfjötli had grown up, he and Sigmund murdered Signy's husband Siggeir. The element of incest also appears in the version of the story used in Wagner's opera-cycle Der Ring des Nibelungen, in which Siegfried is the offspring of Siegmund and his sister Sieglinde.

The legendary Danish king Hrólfr kraki was born from an incestuous union of Halgi and Yrsa.

Chinese
In Chinese mythology, Fu Xi is a king who takes his sister Nüwa as his bride.

Icelandic
In Icelandic folklore a common plot involves a brother and sister (illegally) conceiving a child. They subsequently escape justice by moving to a remote valley. There they proceed to have several more children. The man has some magical abilities which he uses to direct travelers to or away from the valley as he chooses. The siblings always have exactly one daughter but any number of sons. Eventually the magician allows a young man (usually searching for sheep) into the valley and asks him to marry the daughter and give himself and his sister a civilized burial upon their deaths. This is subsequently done.

British/Irish
In the Old Irish saga Tochmarc Étaíne ("The Wooing of Étaín"), Eochaid Airem, the high king of Ireland is tricked into sleeping with his daughter, whom he mistakes for her mother Étaín. The child of their union becomes the mother of the legendary king Conaire Mor.

In some versions of the medieval British legend of King Arthur, Arthur accidentally begets a son by his half sister Morgause in a night of blind lust, then seeks to have the child killed when he hears of a prophecy that it will bring about the undoing of the Round Table. The child survives and later becomes Mordred, his ultimate nemesis.

Danand, a minor character in Irish mythology, is said to have conceived three sons with her own father

Vietnamese
In an ancient Vietnamese folklore, there is a tale of a brother and a sister. As children, the brother and sister fought over a toy. The brother smashes a stone over his sister's head, and the girl falls down unconscious. The boy thinks he has killed his sister, and afraid of punishment, he flees. Years later, by coincidence, they meet again, fall in love, and marry without knowing they are siblings. They build a house along a seashore, and the brother becomes a fisherman while his sister tends to the house. Together they have a son. One day, the brother discovers a scar on his wife's head. She tells him about the childhood fight with her brother, and the brother realizes that he has married his own sister. Overwhelmed with guilt over his incest, the brother goes out on the sea. Every day, the sister climbs to the top of the hill to look for her brother, but he never comes back. She died in waiting and became "Hon Vong Phu" ("the stone waiting for her husband").

Other

In fairy tales of Aarne-Thompson folktale type 510B, the persecuted heroine, the heroine is persecuted by her father, and most usually, the persecution is an attempt to marry her, as in Allerleirauh or Donkeyskin. This was taken up into the legend of Saint Dymphna. In addition, stories of tale type ATU 706, "The Maiden Without Hands", also show the motif of attempted fatherly incest connected with the mutilation of the heroine.

Several child ballads have the motif of incest between brothers and sisters who are raised apart. This is usually unwitting (as in The Bonny Hind and Sheath and Knife, for example), but always brings about a tragic end.

See also
Incest in the Bible
Incest in popular culture

References

Folklore and mythology
Folklore
Mythology